Mohamed Hamout (born 11 December 1993) is a Moroccan boxer. He competed in the men's bantamweight event at the 2016 Summer Olympics. He lost to Robeisy Ramirez of Cuba in the Round of 16. He competed in the men's featherweight event at the 2020 Summer Olympics.

References

External links
 
 
 
 

1993 births
Living people
Moroccan male boxers
Olympic boxers of Morocco
Boxers at the 2016 Summer Olympics
Place of birth missing (living people)
Competitors at the 2019 African Games
African Games medalists in boxing
African Games gold medalists for Morocco
Bantamweight boxers
Boxers at the 2020 Summer Olympics
20th-century Moroccan people
21st-century Moroccan people
Mediterranean Games gold medalists for Morocco
Competitors at the 2022 Mediterranean Games
Mediterranean Games medalists in boxing